Escrever Cinema (English: Writing Cinema) was a Portuguese language film magazine published in Brazil. The magazine presented an auteurist view-points on film, and it featured articles written by many Brazilian film scholars extensively on cinema literature and film making. Its chief film critic was José Carlos Avellar.

References

External links
  

Defunct magazines published in Brazil
Film magazines
Magazines with year of establishment missing
Magazines with year of disestablishment missing
Portuguese-language magazines